Neela is a feminine given name which may refer to:

People:
Neela Marikkar, Chairperson of the Grant McCann Erickson, a leading communications group in Sri Lanka
Neela Padmanabhan (born 1938), Tamil writer
Neela Sathyalingam (1938–2017), Singaporean Tamil classical Indian dancer, choreographer
Neela Satyanarayanan (1948–2020), Indian civil servant
Sikkil Neela (born 1940), Indian flautist, one of the Sikkil Sisters – Kunjumani & Neela
Neela Wickramasinghe (born 1950), Sri Lankan singer and musician
Neela Winkelmann-Heyrovská (born 1969), Czech biologist, environmental activist and government official

Other:
Neela or Nila Devi, a Hindu goddess
Neela (goddess), consort of Shani
Neela Rasgotra, portrayed by Parminder Nagra on the television show ER
Neela (Star Trek), in two episodes of Star Trek: Deep Space Nine

See also
Nila (disambiguation)

Feminine given names